Thorleif Schjelderup-Ebbe (12 November 1894 in Kristiania – 8 June 1976 in Oslo) was a Norwegian zoologist and comparative psychologist. He was the first person to describe a pecking order of hens.

Career
Thorleif Schjelderup-Ebbe was at the age of 19, in 1913, the first to describe a pecking order of hens. He based findings on an interest in observing chickens at a farm where he spend his summer holidays. The dominance hierarchy of chickens and other birds that he studied led him to the observation that hens had an established social order determining who dared to peck whom in a fight. This order was, Schjelderup-Ebbe concluded, not necessarily dependent on the strength or age of the hens, and not necessarily a strict ranking as he even observed triangles of dominance. Schjelderup-Ebbe studied for a Ph.D. in Germany, tried to present his thesis in Oslo, but was rejected.

Personal life
He was the son of sculptors Axel Emil Ebbe (1868–1941) and Menga Schjelderup (1871–1945). He was married to Torbjørg Brekke. Their son was Dag Schjelderup-Ebbe, a musicologist, composer, music critic and biographer.

Publications
 Hønsenes stemme. Bidrag til hønsenes psykologi, in: Naturen: populærvitenskapeling tidsskrift 37, 1913, 262–276
 Kometen: mytisk roman, Kristiania 1917
 Beiträge zur Biologie und Sozial- und Individualpsychologie bei Gallus domesticus, Greifswald 1921
 Gallus domesticus in seinem täglichen Leben, Dissertation Universität Greifswald, 12 May 1921
 Beiträge zur Sozialpsychologie des Haushuhns, in: Zeitschrift für Psychologie 88, 1922, 225–252
 Soziale Verhältnisse bei Vögeln, in: Zeitschrift für Psychologie 90, 1922, 106–107
 Aufmerksamkeit bei Mücken und Fliegen, in: Zeitschrift für Psychologie 93, 1923, 281–282
 Digte, Kristiania 1923
 Der Graupapagei in der Gefangenschaft, in: Psychologische Forschung 3, 1923, 9–11
 Das Leben der Wildente in der Zeit der Paarung, in: Psychologische Forschung 3, 1923, 12–17
 Tanker og aforismer, Kristiania 1923
 Weitere Beiträge zur Sozialpsychologie des Haushuhns, in: Zeitschrift für Psychologie 92, 1923, 60–87
 Les Despotisme chez les oiseaux, in: Bulletin de l'Institut Général Psychologique 24, 1924, 1–74
 Fortgesetzte biologische Beobachtungen bei Gallus domesticus, in: Psychologische Forschung 5, 1924, 343–355
 Kurzgefaßte norwegische Grammatik, Teil 1: Lautlehre, Berlin 1924
 Poppelnatten: digte, Kristiania 1924
 Zur Sozialpsychologie der Vögel, in: Zeitschrift für Psychologie 95, 1924, 36–84
 Det nye eventyr: digte, Oslo 1925
 Soziale Verhältnisse bei Säugetieren, in: Zeitschrift für Psychologie 97, 1925, 145
 Zur Theorie der Mengenlehre, in: Annalen der Philosophie und philosophischen Kritik 5, 1925/1926, 325–328
 Blaat og rødt: digte, Oslo 1926
 Der Kontrast auf dem Gebiete des Licht- und Farbensinnes, in: Neue Psychologische Studien 2, 1926, 61–126
 Sociale tilstande hos utvalgte inferiore vesner, in: Arkiv för psykologi och pedagogik 5, 1926, 105–220
 Organismen und Anorganismen, in: Annalen der Philosophie und philosophischen Kritik 6, 1927, 294–296
 Fra billenes verden, Oslo 1928
 Overhöihetsformer i den menneskelige sociologi, in: Arkiv för Psykologi och Pedagogik 8, 1929, 53–100
 Zur Psychologie der Zahleneindrücke, in: Kwartalnik Psychologiczny 1, 1930, 365–380
 Psychologische Beobachtungen an Vögeln, in: Zeitschrift für Angewandte Psychologie 35, 1930, 362–366
 Die Despotie im sozialen Leben der Vögel, in: Richard Thurnwald (ed.), Forschungen zur Völkerpsychologie und Soziologie 10, 1931, 77–137
 Farben-, Helligkeits-, und Sättigungskontraste bei mitteleuropäischen Käfern, in: Archiv für die Gesamte Psychologie 78, 1931, 571–573
 Liljene på marken, Oslo 1931
 Soziale Eigentümlichkeiten bei Hühnern, in: Kwartalnik Psychologiczny 2, 1931, 206–212
 Instinkte und Reaktionen bei Pfauen und Truthühnern, in: Kwartalnik Psychologiczny 3, 1932, 204–207
 Social behavior of birds, in: Carl Murchison (ed.), A Handbook of Social Psychology, Worcester 1935, 947–972
 Über die Lebensfähigkeit alter Samen, Oslo 1936
 Sanger og strofer, Oslo 1949
 Hva verden sier: en lyrisk, satirisk og virkelighetstro diktsyklus, Oslo 1953
 Liv, reaksjoner og sociologi hos en flerhet insekter, Oslo 1953
 Glansen og det skjulte: lyrikk, humor og satire, Oslo 1955
 Høider og dybder: lyrikk, humor og satire, Oslo 1957
 Life, reactions, and sociology in a number of insects, in: The Journal of Social Psychology, 46, 1957, 287–292
 Sozialpsychologische Analogien bei Menschen und Tier, in: Deutsche Gesellschaft für Psychologie, Bericht über den 22. Kongress der Deutschen Gesellschaft für Psychologie in Heidbelberg 1959, Göttingen 1960, 237–249
 Sol og skygge: aforismer og tanker, Oslo 1965
 Av livets saga: tanker, vers og shortstories, Oslo 1966–1969
 Noen nyere undersøkelser om estetikk, særlig m.h.t. diktning og folklore, Oslo 1967

Notes

Further reading
 Charles W. Leland, Thorleif Schjelderup-Ebbe: Sanger og strofer (Book Review), in: Scandinavian Studies 23, 1951, 208–213
 Charles W. Leland, Thorleif Schjelderup-Ebbe's "Hva verden sier" (Book Review), in: Scandinavian Studies 27, 1955, 206–212
 John Price, A Remembrance of Thorleif Schjelderup-Ebbe, in: Human Ethology Bulletin 1995, 10(1), 1-6 PDF(contains an interview with Th. Schjelderup-Ebbe's son, musicologist Dag Schjelderup-Ebbe)
 Wilhelm Preus Sommerfeldt, Professor dr. Thorleif Schjelderup-Ebbes forfatterskap 1910–1956, Oslo 1957

External links
 Theme issue of Philosophical Transactions B on 'The centennial of the pecking order: current state and future prospects for the study of dominance hierarchies'
 Online edition of the Human Ethology Bulletin
 Thorleif Schjelderup-Ebbe at Norske Biografisk Leksikon

1894 births
1976 deaths
20th-century Norwegian zoologists
Scientists from Oslo